The C. Z. Culver House is a historic home within Old Towne Orange, California. It is part of the Old Towne Historic District. The home is a two-story building, with a large grass filled front yard built in the Victorian architectural style. A historical marker, placed by the United States Department of the Interior is at the south west corner of the home, or the north east corner of the intersection of East Palmyra and South Orange Street. The plaque is to notify visitors that the home was officially placed on the National Register of Historic Places on March 20, 1986. The home is currently unavailable to tour.

References

National Register of Historic Places in Orange County, California
Queen Anne architecture in California
Houses completed in 1888
Buildings and structures in Orange, California
Houses in Orange County, California